The 2007 World Wrestling Championships were held at the Heydar Aliyev Sports and Concert Complex in Baku, Azerbaijan. The event took place from September 17 to September 23, 2007.

Medal table

Team ranking

Medal summary

Men's freestyle

Men's Greco-Roman

Women's freestyle

Participating nations
797 competitors from 92 nations participated.

 (2)
 (5)
 (15)
 (13)
 (4)
 (19)
 (1)
 (21)
 (1)
 (5)
 (17)
 (2)
 (17)
 (1)
 (1)
 (21)
 (4)
 (10)
 (2)
 (3)
 (13)
 (2)
 (10)
 (3)
 (3)
 (1)
 (7)
 (2)
 (6)
 (3)
 (8)
 (15)
 (14)
 (21)
 (1)
 (19)
 (2)
 (1)
 (2)
 (2)
 (19)
 (21)
 (14)
 (13)
 (1)
 (9)
 (16)
 (2)
 (21)
 (2)
 (21)
 (14)
 (12)
 (9)
 (5)
 (3)
 (13)
 (14)
 (4)
 (2)
 (1)
 (5)
 (6)
 (4)
 (1)
 (3)
 (19)
 (1)
 (7)
 (3)
 (18)
 (21)
 (5)
 (6)
 (4)
 (2)
 (5)
 (20)
 (13)
 (9)
 (10)
 (4)
 (6)
 (10)
 (16)
 (5)
 (1)
 (21)
 (21)
 (18)
 (12)
 (6)

References
Results Book

External links
Official website

 
FILA Wrestling World Championships
World Wrestling Championships
Wrestling World Championships
World